Chiloepalpus aurifacies is a species of tachinid flies in the genus Chiloepalpus of the family Tachinidae.

External links

Tachinidae
Insects described in 1927
Diptera of South America